Elizabeth Ellen Rice (born November 5, 1985) is an American actress, performing in television and film. She began her entertainment career at the young age of five.

Education, awards and nominations
She attended New York film academy and later graduated from North Carolina State University.

She won the Grand Jury Award in the 2008 Solstice Film Festival for Best Actress for From Within (2008).

Filmography

Film

Television

External links
 

1985 births
Actresses from Arkansas
American child actresses
American film actresses
American television actresses
Living people
People from Pine Bluff, Arkansas
20th-century American actresses
21st-century American actresses